The Bloc for Mallorca (Bloc) was an electoral alliance in Mallorca formed by the PSM–Nationalist Agreement, United Left–The Greens Alternative and Republican Left of Catalonia to contest the 2007 Balearic regional election.

Composition

References

Political parties in the Balearic Islands
Defunct political party alliances in Spain
Political parties established in 2006
Political parties disestablished in 2011